Centerville is an unincorporated community in Butte County, California along Butte Creek. It was midway between Helltown and Diamondville. The area is about one and three quarters miles, straight-line distance, west of Paradise.

Geography
The US Geological Survey defines it as a populated place with a feature ID of 1658249. The area is inside area code 530.

History
The post office was named for John Adams, its first postmaster, and operated from 1880 to 1913.

Centerville Power Plant is a small hydroelectric power plant in the community.  When the plant is in operation, the volume of water in the creek goes up. Signs downstream along Butte Creek warn that the water level can rise suddenly without warning. The facility was built about 1900 and generates electricity using water facilities that once supplied a hydraulic mine during California's Gold Rush.

References 

Unincorporated communities in California
Unincorporated communities in Butte County, California